Tenby is both a walled seaside town in Pembrokeshire, Wales, on the western side of Carmarthen Bay, and a local government community.

Notable features include  of sandy beaches and the Pembrokeshire Coast Path, the 13th century medieval town walls, including the Five Arches barbican gatehouse, Tenby Museum and Art Gallery, the 15th century St. Mary's Church, and the National Trust's Tudor Merchant's House.

Boats sail from Tenby's harbour to the offshore monastic Caldey Island. St Catherine's Island is tidal and has a 19th century Palmerston Fort.

The town has an operating railway station.

History 

With its strategic position on the far west coast of Britain, and a natural sheltered harbour from both the Atlantic Ocean and the Irish Sea, Tenby was a natural settlement point, probably a hill fort with the mercantile nature of the settlement possibly developing under Hiberno-Norse influence.

Tenby was taken by the Normans, when they invaded West Wales in the early 12th century. The town's first stone-wall fortification was on Castle Hill. Tenby's mercantile trade grew as it developed as a major seaport in Norman controlled Little England beyond Wales. However, the need for additional defences became paramount after the settlement and castle were successfully attacked and sacked by Welsh forces of Maredudd ap Gruffydd and Rhys ap Gruffydd in 1153. Sacking of the town was repeated in 1187 and again by Llywelyn ap Gruffudd in 1260. After the final attack, William de Valence, 1st Earl of Pembroke ordered the construction of the Tenby town walls in the late 13th century. The stone curtain wall, towers and gates enclosed a large part of the settlementnow known as the "old town". With the construction of the town walls, Tenby Castle was made obsolete and had been abandoned by the end of the 14th century.

In 1457, Jasper Tudor, the uncle of Henry Tudor, agreed to share with the town's merchants the costs of refurbishing and improving Tenby's defences because of its economic importance to this part of Wales. Work included heightening the wall to include a second tier of higher arrow slits behind a new parapet walk.

Consequently, in the Late Middle Ages, Tenby was awarded royal grants to finance the maintenance and improvement of its defences and the enclosure of its harbour. Traders sailed along the coast to Bristol and Ireland and further afield to France, Spain and Portugal. Exports included wool, skins, canvas, coal, iron and oil; while in 1566 Portuguese seamen landed the first oranges in Wales. It was during this period that the town was so busy and important, it was considered to be a national port. During the Wars of the Roses Henry Tudor, the future King Henry VII of England, sheltered at Tenby before sailing into exile in 1471.

In the mid 16th century, the large D-shaped tower known as the "Five Arches" was built following fears of a second Spanish Armada.

Two key events caused the town to undergo rapid and permanent decline in importance. First, Tenby declared for Parliament in the English Civil War. After resisting two attempts by the Royalists forces of Charles Gerard, 1st Earl of Macclesfield, it was finally taken in 1648. Ten weeks later the shattered town was surrendered to Colonel Thomas Horton, who welcomed Oliver Cromwell shortly afterwards. Second, a plague outbreak killed half of the town's remaining population in 1650.

With limited infrastructure, resources and people, the town's economy fell into decline. Most of the merchant and business class left, resulting in the town's decay and ruin. By the end of the 18th century, John Wesley noted during his visit how: "Two-thirds of the old town is in ruins or has entirely vanished. Pigs roam among the abandoned houses and Tenby presents a dismal spectacle."

Another war led to a resurgence in Tenby's fortunes. Since 1798, the French General Napoleon Bonaparte had begun conquering Europe restricting the rich British upper classes from making their Grand Tours to continental spa towns. In 1802 local resident, merchant banker and politician, Sir William Paxton, bought his first property in the old town. From this point onwards he invested heavily in the area with the full approval of the town council.

With the growth in saltwater sea-bathing for health purposes, Paxton engaged engineer James Grier and architect Samuel Pepys Cockerell (the same team who had built his home at Middleton Hall) to create a "fashionable bathing establishment suitable for the highest society." His sea-bathing baths came into operation in July 1806 and, after acquiring the Globe Inn, transformed it into "a most lofty, elegant and convenient style" to lodge the more elegant visitors to his baths. Cottages were erected adjoining the baths with adjoining livery stables and coach house.

A road was built on arches overlooking the harbour at Paxton's full expense in 1814. He had a Private Act of Parliament passed that enabled fresh water to be piped through the town. Despite these accomplishments, his 1809 theatre was closed in 1818 due to lack of patronage. The Market Hall was completed in 1829 and remodelled to serve as Tenby Town Hall in 1860.

Paxton also took in "tour" developments in the area as required by rich Victorian tourists. This included the discovery of a chalybeate spring in his own park at Middleton Hall, and coaching inns from Swansea to Narberth. He built Paxton's Tower, in memorial to Lord Nelson whom he had met in 1802 when mayor of Carmarthen. Paxton's efforts to revive the town succeeded and after the Battle of Trafalgar, the growth of Victorian Tenby was inevitable.

Through both the Georgian and Victorian eras Tenby was renowned as a health resort and centre for botanical and geological study. With many features of the town being constructed to provide areas for healthy seaside walks, due to the walkways being built to accommodate Victorian nannies pushing prams, many of the beaches today still retain good disabled access. In 1856 writer Mary Ann Evans (pen-name George Eliot) accompanied George Henry Lewes to Tenby to gather materials for his work Seaside Studies published in 1858.

In 1852, the Shipwrecked Fishermen and Mariners' Royal Benevolent Society deployed a lifeboat to the town, taken over in 1854 by the Royal National Lifeboat Institution. In 1905 a slip-way equipped lifeboat station was built on Castle Hill. It was replaced by a modern station in 2008.

Tenby railway station and the Pembroke and Tenby Railway were opened as far as Pembroke on 30 July 1863. The extended line to Pembroke Dock opened on 8 August 1864. In 1866, the line was connected to Whitland railway station. In 1867, work began on the construction of the Palmerston Fort on St Catherine's Island. The Army had control of the fort during 18871895.

The old town castle walls have survived, as does the Victorian revival architecture in a pastel colour scheme. The economy is based on tourism, supported by a range of craft, art and other stores. , there are 372 listed buildings and other structures in and around Tenby.

Governance
There are two tiers of local government covering Tenby, at community (town) and county level: Tenby Town Council and Pembrokeshire County Council. The town council is based at the De Valence Pavilion on Upper Frog Street.

Tenby was an ancient borough, having been given a charter in 1290 by William de Valence, 1st Earl of Pembroke, and being formally incorporated as a borough by Elizabeth I in 1581. The borough was reformed to become a municipal borough in 1836. From 1860 until 1947 the borough council was based at Tenby Town Hall on High Street. In 1947 the council moved to Croft House on The Norton, later renaming it Guildhall. Tenby Borough Council was abolished under the Local Government Act 1972, with the area becoming part of the new district of South Pembrokeshire within the county of Dyfed on 1 April 1974. A community was established to cover the area of the former borough, with its council taking the name Tenby Town Council. The town council continued to be based at the guildhall until the mid 1980s when it moved to the De Valence Pavilion on Upper Frog Street. The district of South Pembrokeshire was abolished in 1996, with the area becoming part of a re-established Pembrokeshire.

Education 
There are four schools in the Tenby schools area, consisting of three primary schools and one secondary school: Ysgol Hafan-y-Mor, Tenby Church in Wales Primary School, St. Teilo's RC School and Ysgol Greenhill Secondary.

Pupils from St. Teilo's School and Tenby Church in Wales School are automatically enrolled in the Greenhill School, but parents can enrol them into a different school. Ysgol Hafan y Môr is a Welsh language medium school. Most of the pupils go on to Ysgol y Preseli, a Welsh-medium secondary school in Crymych.

Previous schools in the area were Tenby V.C. Infants School which was an English medium school with a Welsh unit. Pupils from this school would automatically enrol in Tenby Junior School which has now been converted into Ysgol Hafan y Môr. Tenby V.C. Infant school was demolished in 2016 and turned into a field for the nearby Greenhill School.

Tourism 

Attractions include the two sheltered, sandy beaches and the coastal boat trips to Caldey Island. St Catherine's Island is tidal and the site of St Catherine's Fort a 19th century Palmerston Fort. In August 2016, the fort faced an "uncertain future" and was closed to the public. Tenby has shops, pubs and restaurants to cater for visitors. The Sunday Times rated Tenby's Castle Beach the best beach in the UK in 2019.

Transport

Tenby railway station serves the town on the  branch of the West Wales Line operated by Transport for Wales Rail, who also manage the station. During peak season, trains run direct from Paddington to Tenby.

The nearest airport is Cardiff International.

Sport 
Tenby United RFC, a rugby union club has existed since 1876. It is a member of the Welsh Rugby Union.

In 1970, the Tenby Sea Swimming Association started the Boxing Day Swim. It is Tenby's main Christmas attraction now, with approximately 600 swimmers, most in fancy dress, watched by thousands of onlookers. Each swimmer who enters for a charity receives a medal. The Osborne family has been associated with the event from the beginning and Chris Osborne, chairman of TSSA has seen it take place in every weather condition, from brilliant sunshine to freezing winds.

Tenby hosts the Welsh Ironman Triathlon in September. There is also the Tenby Aces Cycling Club and the 18-hole Tenby Golf Course that provides links golf by the coast.

Notable people

Alison Bielski, poet and writer
Michael Bonacini, chef, born and raised in Tenby
Rhidian Brook, writer, born in Tenby
Ernle Chatfield, 1st Baron Chatfield, educated at St Andrew's School, Tenby
Charles Dale, actor, born in Tenby
Kenneth Griffith, actor
Augustus John, artist, born in Tenby
Gwen John, artist
Kate Lamb, actress, grew up in Tenby
Michael Lieber, writer and actor
Clive Merrison, actor
Charles Norris, etcher
Gwilym Prichard, artist
Robert Recorde, mathematician

Wally the Walrus 

On 19 March 2021, an Arctic walrus was spotted on the rocks of Broad Haven South beach, after initially making the journey over from Ireland. During its time in Tenby, it was situated primarily on the new RNLI Lifeboat Tenby slipway. Wally was not spotted between 5 to 8 April 2021 and there were concerns that sightseers had driven him away, but he was back regularly resting on the slipway later in the month, and on one occasion had to be moved to allow the slipway to be used.

Some believed that the walrus made the journey from the Arctic on an ice floe. The RSPCA believes this is the most southernly sighting of the species; occasionally they can be seen in Scotland.

Despite spending most of his days resting and scavenging for food, he has been causing some mischief. It was reported that he capsized a dingy and damaged a fishing boat trying to board the vessels.

Freedom of the Town
The following people and military units have received the Freedom of the Town of Tenby.

Individuals
 Rt Hon David Lloyd George 
 Augustus John : 30 October 1959.

Military Units
 HMS Tenby, RN

Climate 
Tenby experiences a maritime climate with cool summers, mild winters and often high winds. Due to its coastal southwest position, it is one of the sunnier locations in Wales.

Gallery

See also
 Tenby Castle
 Allen's of Tenby

References

External links 

 Around Tenby is the Official Website Around Tenby CIC (Charity Interest Company) is the official site backed by the Tenby Chamber of Business and Tourism and supported by https://www.visitpembrokeshire.com
 Tenby Town Council
 Further historical information and sources on GENUKI
 Tenby Memorial Committee

 
Towns in Pembrokeshire
Communities in Pembrokeshire
Seaside resorts in Wales
Tourist attractions in Pembrokeshire
Fortified settlements
Populated coastal places in Wales
Coast of Pembrokeshire